In algebraic geometry, Lang's theorem, introduced by Serge Lang, states: if G is a connected smooth algebraic group over a finite field , then, writing  for the Frobenius, the morphism of varieties
 
is surjective. Note that the kernel of this map (i.e.) is precisely .

The theorem implies that   
Also, the theorem plays a basic role in the theory of finite groups of Lie type.

It is not necessary that G is affine. Thus, the theorem also applies to abelian varieties (e.g., elliptic curves.) In fact, this application was Lang's initial motivation. If G is affine, the Frobenius  may be replaced by any surjective map with finitely many fixed points (see below for the precise statement.)

The proof (given below) actually goes through for any  that induces a nilpotent operator on the Lie algebra of G.

The Lang–Steinberg theorem 
 gave a useful improvement to the theorem.

Suppose that F is an endomorphism of an algebraic group G. The Lang map is the map from G to G taking g to g−1F(g).

The Lang–Steinberg theorem states that if F is surjective and has a finite number of fixed points, and G is a connected affine algebraic group over an algebraically closed field,  then the Lang map is surjective.

Proof of Lang's theorem 
Define:

Then (identifying the tangent space at a with the tangent space at the identity element) we have:
 
where . It follows  is bijective since the differential of the Frobenius  vanishes. Since , we also see that  is bijective for any b.

Notes

References 
 

Algebraic groups
Theorems in algebraic geometry